Roman Babyak (born 28 February 1998 in Ukraine) is a professional Ukrainian football defender who currently plays for the Ukrainian Premier League club Volyn Lutsk.

Career
Babyak is a product of the Sportive youth school of FC Volyn Lutsk. 

He made his debut for FC Volyn Lutsk played as a substituted player in the game against FC Karpaty Lviv on 27 May 2017 in the Ukrainian Premier League.

References

External links 

 

1998 births
Living people
Ukrainian footballers
Ukrainian Premier League players
FC Volyn Lutsk players
Association football defenders